Simone Mortaro (born 12 September 1989 in Marsciano) is an Italian footballer who plays as a forward. He is currently playing for Sansepolcro Calcio.

See also
Football in Italy
List of football clubs in Italy

References

External links
  
 

1989 births
Italian footballers
Living people
A.S.D. Victor San Marino players
Association football forwards